Jakes Peak is a  mountain summit located in the Sierra Nevada mountain range in El Dorado County, California, United States. It is set within the Desolation Wilderness, on land managed by Eldorado National Forest.

Etymology
This mountain's name remembers ski patroller Jeffery James Smith (1954–1982), commonly known as "Jake", and in honor of the other six persons who also died in an avalanche at the Alpine Meadows Ski Area on March 31, 1982. This landform's toponym was officially adopted in 1985 by the U.S. Board on Geographic Names.

Climate
According to the Köppen climate classification system, Jakes Peak is located in an alpine climate zone. Most weather fronts originate in the Pacific Ocean, and travel east toward the Sierra Nevada mountains. As fronts approach, they are forced upward by the peaks (orographic lift), causing them to drop their moisture in the form of rain or snowfall onto the range. Precipitation runoff from the mountain drains to Lake Tahoe.

Gallery

See also
 
 Desolation Wilderness

References

External links
 Weather forecast: Jakes Peak
 Jake Smith (story and photo): Tahoe Quarterly

Eldorado National Forest
Mountains of El Dorado County, California
Mountains of the Desolation Wilderness
North American 2000 m summits
Mountains of Northern California
Sierra Nevada (United States)